The 1987–88 season is FC Lokomotiv Gorna Oryahovitsa's 2nd season in A PFG.

First-team squad 

 25/0
 30/0
 27/0
 27/0
 28/3
 29/7
 26/7
 26/4
 25/6
 24/3

 3/0
 27/0
 21/9
 25/0
 13/1
 10/1
 6/0
 3/0

Fixtures

League

The team is finished 13th after 30 games in his second "A"group's season.

League standings

References

External links
 1987–88 A PFG
 Lokomotiv Gorna Oryahovitsa official website

FC Lokomotiv Gorna Oryahovitsa seasons
Lokomotiv Gorna Oryahovitsa